The 2011–12 Georgia Bulldogs basketball team represented the University of Georgia during the college basketball season of 2011–2012. The team's head coach was Mark Fox, who was in his third season at UGA. They played their home games at Stegeman Coliseum and were members of the Southeastern Conference.

Previous season
The Bulldogs finished the 2010–11 season 21–12 overall, 9–7 in SEC play and lost in the first round of the NCAA tournament to Washington.

Roster

Source:

Schedule

|-
!colspan=9| Exhibition

|-
!colspan=9| Regular season

|-
!colspan=9| SEC Regular Season

|-
!colspan=9| 2012 SEC tournament

References

Georgia Bulldogs basketball seasons
Georgia Bulldogs
Bulldogs
Bulldogs